Oscar Traynor (21 March 1886 – 14 December 1963) was an Irish Fianna Fáil politician and republican who served as Minister for Justice from 1957 to 1961, Minister for Defence from 1939 to 1948 and 1951 to 1954, Minister for Posts and Telegraphs from 1936 to 1939 and Parliamentary Secretary to the Minister for Defence from June 1936 to November 1936. He served as a Teachta Dála (TD) from 1925 to 1927 and 1932 to 1961.

He was also involved with association football, being the president of the Football Association of Ireland (FAI) from 1948 until 1963.

Life
Oscar Traynor was born on 21 March 1886 in 32 Upper Abbey St., Dublin, to Patrick Traynor, bookseller, and his wife Maria Traynor (née Clarke). He was educated by at St Mary's Place, Christian Brothers school. In 1899, he was apprenticed to John Long, a famous wood-carver. Traynor later qualified as a compositor.

As a young man he was a noted footballer and toured Europe as a goalkeeper with Belfast Celtic F.C. whom he played with from 1910 to 1912. Traynor rejected claims soccer was a foreign sport calling it "a Celtic game, pure and simple, having its roots in the Highlands of Scotland."

Traynor joined the Irish Volunteers and took part in the Easter Rising in 1916 being the leader of the Metropole Hotel garrison. Following this he was interned in Wales. During the Irish War of Independence, he was brigadier of the Dublin Brigade of the Irish Republican Army and led the disastrous attack on The Custom House in 1921 and an ambush on the West Kent Regiment at Claude Road, Drumcondra on 16 June 1921 when the Thompson submachine gun was fired for the first time in action.

When the Irish Civil War broke out in June 1922, Traynor took the Anti-Treaty IRA side. The Dublin Brigade was split, however, with many of its members following Michael Collins in taking the pro-Treaty side. During the Battle of Dublin he was in charge of the Barry's Hotel garrison, before making their escape. He organised guerilla activity in south Dublin and County Wicklow, before being captured by Free State troops in September. He was then imprisoned for the remainder of the war.

On 11 March 1925, he was elected to Dáil Éireann in a by-election as a Sinn Féin TD for the Dublin North constituency, though he did not take his seat due to the abstentionist policy of Sinn Féin. He was re-elected as one of eight members for Dublin North in the June 1927 general election but just one of six Sinn Féin TDs. Once again, he did not take his seat. Traynor did not contest the second general election called that year but declared his support for Fianna Fáil. He stood again in the 1932 general election and was elected as a Fianna Fáil TD for Dublin North.

In 1936, he was first appointed to the Cabinet as Minister for Posts and Telegraphs. In September 1939, Traynor was appointed Minister for Defence and held the portfolio to February 1948. In 1948, he became president of the Football Association of Ireland, a position he held until his death. He served as Minister for Defence in several Fianna Fáil governments and as Minister for Justice, where he was undermined by his junior minister, and later Taoiseach, Charles Haughey, before he retired in 1961.

Oscar Traynor died on 15 December 1963, in Dublin at the age of 77.

He has a road named in his memory, running from the Malahide Road through Coolock to Santry in Dublin's northern suburbs.

References

 

1886 births
1963 deaths
Politicians from Dublin (city)
Association football goalkeepers
Belfast Celtic F.C. players
Irish association footballers (before 1923)
People of the Irish Civil War (Anti-Treaty side)
Early Sinn Féin TDs
Irish sportsperson-politicians
Irish Republican Army (1919–1922) members
Irish Republican Army (1922–1969) members
Fianna Fáil TDs
Members of the 4th Dáil
Members of the 5th Dáil
Members of the 7th Dáil
Members of the 8th Dáil
Members of the 9th Dáil
Members of the 10th Dáil
Members of the 11th Dáil
Members of the 12th Dáil
Members of the 13th Dáil
Members of the 14th Dáil
Members of the 15th Dáil
Members of the 16th Dáil
Parliamentary Secretaries of the 8th Dáil
Ministers for Defence (Ireland)
Ministers for Justice (Ireland)
Football Association of Ireland officials